The Ballentine Place Historic District is a national historic district located at Norfolk, Virginia. It encompasses 860 contributing buildings, 1 contributing site, and 1 contributing object in a cohesive residential neighborhood located near the center of Norfolk. It was platted in 1909, and largely developed between 1915 and 1953.  The district includes a park developed in the 1930s by the Works Progress Administration (WPA).  Notable non-residential buildings include the Ballentine School (1915-1916), Trinity Baptist Church (1953), United New Life Church of Christ in Holiness Church (1930), the Emmanuel Holy Temple Church (once the Fairmont Park Sunday School, 1920), and the Tabernacle of the Congregation Church of God in Christ (1930).

It was listed on the National Register of Historic Places in 2003.

References

Houses on the National Register of Historic Places in Virginia
Historic districts on the National Register of Historic Places in Virginia
National Register of Historic Places in Norfolk, Virginia
Victorian architecture in Virginia
Neighborhoods in Norfolk, Virginia
Houses in Norfolk, Virginia